The Magic Night Stakes is an Australian Turf Club Group 3 Thoroughbred horse race, for two-year-old fillies, at set weights, over a distance of 1200 metres, held annually at Rosehill Racecourse in Sydney, Australia in March. Total prize money for the race is A$200,000.

History

The race is named in honour of Magic Night, winner of the 1961 Golden Slipper Stakes.

For the 2016 running the race was named in honour of trainer Bede Murray who died a week before the race.
 
Five fillies have captured the Magic Night – Golden Slippers double: Toy Show (1975), Dark Eclipse (1980), Bounding Away (1986),  Bint Marscay (1993) and Kiamichi (2019).

Name

1975–1984 - Magic Night Quality Handicap
1985–1988 - Magic Night Quality Stakes
1989 onwards  - Magic Night Stakes

Grade

1975–1979 -  Principal Race
1979–1986 -  Listed Race
1980–1985 -  Group 3
1986–2016 -  Group 2
2017 - Group 3

Winners

 2023 - Steel City
 2022 - She's Extreme
 2021 - Arcaded  
 2020 - Thermosphere  
 2019 - Kiamichi 
 2018 - Sunlight 
 2017 - Tulip 
 2016 - Calliope 
 2015 - Speak Fondly
 2014 - Bring Me The Maid
 2013 - Scandiva
 2012 - Ichihara
 2011 - Altar
 2010 - Willow Creek
 2009 - Indian Ocean
 2008 - Portillo
 2007 - Downhill Racer
 2006 - Gold Edition
 2005 - Media
 2004 - Alizes
 2003 - Shamekha
 2002 - Victory Vein
 2001 - Hosannah
 2000 - Preserve
 1999 - Countess Christie
 1998 - Mardi's Magic
 1997 - Regal Chamber
 1996 - Precious Glitter
 1995 - Pontal Lass
 1994 - Romantica
 1993 - Bint Marscay
 1992 - Klokka
 1991 - Pipiwar
 1990 - Draw Card
 1989 - Fickle Hostess
 1988 - Comely Girl
 1987 - Tennessee Vain
 1986 - Bounding Away
 1985 - Ma Chiquita
 1984 - Pashenka's Gem
 1983 - Lady Eclipse
 1982 - Explicit 
 1981 - Food For Love  
 1980 - Dark Eclipse 
 1979 - Century Miss 
 1978 - Jubilee Walk
 1977 - Lloyd Boy 
 1976 - †As You Like It / Glen Vain  
 1975 - Toy Show  

† Race run in Divisions

See also
 List of Australian Group races
 Group races

References

External links 
First three placegetters Magic Night Stakes (ATC)

Horse races in Australia